Meg Jackson may refer to:

 Meg Jackson (Prisoner), a character in the Australian TV series Prisoner
 Meg Jackson (screenwriter), American screenwriter